is a former Japanese football player.

Club statistics

References

External links

 J League 2009 Tochigi S.C. player list 

1985 births
Living people
Hosei University alumni
Association football people from Tochigi Prefecture
Japanese footballers
J2 League players
Japan Football League players
Tochigi SC players
Tochigi City FC players
Association football forwards